Makedonikos Siatista Football Club is a Greek football club, based in Siatista, Kozani (regional unit), Greece.

Honours

Domestic Titles and honours

 Gamma Ethniki champion: 1
 1977-78
 North-West Macedonia FCA champion: 3
 1966-67, 1971-72, 1976-77
 North-West Macedonia Cup Winners: 3
 1972-73, 1973-74, 1980-81
 Kozani FCA champion: 2
 1987-88, 2017-18
 Kozani FCA Cup Winners: 1
 1989-90

References

Football clubs in Western Macedonia
Kozani (regional unit)
Association football clubs established in 1954
1954 establishments in Greece
Gamma Ethniki clubs